Garner may refer to:

Places

United States
 Garner, Arkansas
 Garner, Iowa
 Garner, Missouri
 Garner, North Carolina

Other uses
 Garner (surname), a surname
 Granary, a grain store
 Tennessee v. Garner, a United States Supreme Court case dealing with the use of deadly force
 , a United States Navy minesweeper in commission from 1917 to 1919

See also
Gartner, information technology research firm